Naththathanar, also known in full as Nallur Naththathanar or Idaikkali Naattu Nallur Naththathanar (Tamil: இடைக்கழி நாட்டு நல்லூர் நத்தத்தனார்), was a poet of the Sangam period who authored Sirupanatruppadai in the Pattuppattu anthology of the Sangam literature. In addition, verse 16 of the Tiruvalluva Maalai is also attributed to him.

Biography
Naththathanar hailed from the Idaikkali country and is believed to have an excellent knowledge of geography of the ancient Tamil land, including the cities of Madurai, Uraiyur, and Vanchi.

Contribution to the Sangam literature
Naththathanar has composed Sirupanatruppadai, a 269-line poetry in the Achiriyappa meter, under the Pattuppattu anthology. In addition, he has also written verse 16 of the Tiruvalluva Maalai.

See also

 Sangam literature
 List of Sangam poets
 Tiruvalluva Maalai

Notes

Tamil philosophy
Tamil poets
Sangam poets
Tiruvalluva Maalai contributors